Cudalbi is a commune in Galați County, Western Moldavia, Romania with a population of 6,319 people. It is composed of a single village, Cudalbi.

Natives
 Valeriu Andrunache

References

Communes in Galați County
Localities in Western Moldavia